The Valjean Hills are a low mountain range in the eastern Mojave Desert, in northern San Bernardino County, southern California.

They are located east of the Salt Spring Hills and southeastern Death Valley National Park, and west of Mount Charleston in the Spring Mountains.

See also
Other ranges in the local area include the:
 Avawatz Mountains
 Saddle Peak Hills
 Salt Spring Hills
 Silurian Hills
 Sperry Hills

References 

Mountain ranges of the Mojave Desert
Mountain ranges of San Bernardino County, California
Hills of California